David Pereira da Costa (born 15 March 1977), simply known as David, is a former Brazilian footballer who played as a striker.

David's most memorable moment of his thirteen-year career was scoring the winner in a fourth round Taça de Portugal tie against Porto at the Estádio do Dragão whilst playing for Atlético CP.

References

External links
 

1977 births
Living people
Sportspeople from Pernambuco
Brazilian footballers
Association football forwards
Segunda Divisão players
Liga Portugal 2 players
Cypriot First Division players
Juventude Sport Clube players
S.C.U. Torreense players
C.D. Aves players
C.F. União players
Apollon Limassol FC players
Ethnikos Achna FC players
Aris Limassol FC players
APEP FC players
Brazilian expatriate footballers
Expatriate footballers in Cyprus
Brazilian expatriate sportspeople in Cyprus
Expatriate footballers in Portugal
Brazilian expatriate sportspeople in Portugal